Sclerophthora rayssiae is a plant pathogen infecting barley and maize.

References

External links

Peronosporales
Water mould plant pathogens and diseases
Barley diseases
Maize diseases